Mayilai Seeni. Venkatasami (16 December 1900 – 8 May 1980) was a Tamil researcher, scholar, historian and writer from Tamil Nadu, India.

Biography
Seeni. Venkatasami was born in Mylapore, Chennai. His father was a Siddha medicine practitioner. He had two elder brothers. The eldest brother was a Siddha doctor like their father. The second brother Seeni. Govindarajan was a Tamil scholar. He has written literary works like Thirukkural Kamathuppaal Naatkal and Thirumayilai Naanmani Kadigai. Venkatasamy initially learnt Tamil from Govindarajan and later from Mahavidwan Shanmugam Pillai and Pandit Sargunar. He joined the editorial team of the Justice Party magazine Dravidan. He was interested in art and studied for some time in Egmore Arts School. To support his family financially he joined Santhome corporation school as a teacher. During his vacation days he traveled to places of worship and places of historical importance all over Tamil Nadu and conducted field research in archaeology, epigraphy and numismatics. He learnt all South Indian writing systems like Brahmi, Grantha and Tamil. He also knew Kannada and Malayalam. He researched Jain and Buddhist archaeological places of interest which had been largely ignored by the Hindu historians. He served as the president of the Chennai Writers Association twice.

In 2000, the Government of Tamil Nadu nationalised his writings.

Bibliography
Kirithuvamum Tamilum
Bouthamum Tamilum
Samanamum Tamilum
Mahabalipurathu Jaina Sirpam
Irayanar Kalaviyal 
Boutha Kadhaigal
Iraivan Aadiya Ezhuvagai Thaandavangal
Magendiravarman
Narasimmavarman
Moondram Nandivarman
Buddha Jathaka Kadaigal
Anjiraithumbi
Gowthama Budhar
Maraindhu pona Tamil noolgal
Saasanach seyyum Manjari
Manonmaneeya Araychiyum Urayum
Pazhangalath Thamizh Vaanigam
Kongu Naatu Varalaaru
Kalappirar Aatchiyil Tamilagam
Isaivaanar Kadhaigal
Unavu Nool
Tuluva Naatu Varalaaru - Link to Book 1, 2
Samayangal Valartha Tamil
Sangakaalath Tamilaga Varalaaril sila seidhigal
Cheran Chenguttuvan
Pathanbadhaam Noorrandu Tamil ilakkiyam
Sanga Kaalach Chera Chola Paandiyar
Sanga Kaalathu Bramik kalvettuzhuthukkal
Nun Kalaigal
Tamilar Valartha Alagu Kalaigal
Sirupaanan Sendra Peruvazhi
Mahendiravarman Iyarriya Mathavilaasam
Palanthamizhum Palvagai samayamum

References

1900 births
1980 deaths
Tamil writers
Scientists from Chennai
20th-century Indian historians